Najafqoli Khan or Najafqoli Khan b. Qazaq Khan Cherkes was an Iranian gholam of Circassian origin, who served as beglerbeg (governor) of Shirvan (1st term; 1653, 2nd term; 1663–67) and of the Erivan Province (also known as Chokhur-e Sa'd; 1656-1663). He was the son of the Safavid-Circassian military commander and governor Qazaq Khan Cherkes. In total, he held the governorship of Shirvan for 7 years.

Sources
 
  
 

Iranian people of Circassian descent
Safavid governors of Erivan
Safavid governors of Shirvan
Date of birth unknown
Date of death unknown
17th-century people of Safavid Iran